The 1999 UEFA Women's World Cup qualification was held between 21 August 1997 and 11 October 1998.
The 16 teams belonging to Class A of European women's football were drawn into four groups, from which the group winners qualified for the 1999 FIFA Women's World Cup. The four runners-up were drawn into two home-and-away knock-out matches, winners of those matches also qualifying. Sweden, Italy, Norway, Denmark, Germany and Russia qualified for the 1999 FIFA Women's World Cup.

CLASS A

Group 1

Sweden qualified for 1999 FIFA Women's World Cup.

Group 2

Italy qualified for 1999 FIFA Women's World Cup.

Group 3

Norway qualified for 1999 FIFA Women's World Cup.

Group 4

Denmark qualified for 1999 FIFA Women's World Cup.

CLASS B

Group 5

Group 6

Group 7

  withdrew after two matches.

Group 8

Playoff A

Russia qualified for 1999 FIFA Women's World Cup.

Germany qualified for 1999 FIFA Women's World Cup.

Playoff B

References

External links
Tables & results at RSSSF.com
FIFA Women's World Cup USA 1999 – Preliminaries – European Zone at FIFA.com

1997 in women's association football
1998 in women's association football
UEFA
Women
Women
1999